Lyonshall railway station was a station in Lyonshall, Herefordshire, England. The station was opened in 1874 and closed in 1940. It is located on the A480, south east of the village.

References

Further reading

Disused railway stations in Herefordshire
Railway stations in Great Britain opened in 1874
Railway stations in Great Britain closed in 1917
Railway stations in Great Britain opened in 1922
Railway stations in Great Britain closed in 1940
Former Great Western Railway stations
1874 establishments in England